The 1990 du Maurier Classic was contested from June 28 to July 1 at Westmount Golf & Country Club. It was the 18th edition of the du Maurier Classic, and the 12th edition as a major championship on the LPGA Tour.

This event was won by Cathy Johnston-Forbes.

Final leaderboard

External links
 Golf Observer source

Canadian Women's Open
Sport in Kitchener, Ontario
du Maurier Classic
du Maurier Classic
du Maurier Classic
du Maurier Classic